Must Australia Fight? is a 1939 book by Ion Idriess. It dealt with whether Australia was prepared for invasion. In particular, it focuses on what might happen if the British fleet were not able to come to Australia's assistance.

References

1939 non-fiction books
Australian non-fiction books
Books by Ion Idriess
Angus & Robertson books